Ahmed Shahab (born 1 May 1969) is a Pakistani cricket umpire. He stood in his first Twenty20 International match on 4 December 2014 between Pakistan and New Zealand in the United Arab Emirates. He stood in his first One Day International match on 10 January 2015 between Afghanistan and Ireland in the UAE tri-series.

See also
 List of One Day International cricket umpires
 List of Twenty20 International cricket umpires

References

External links
 

1969 births
Living people
Pakistani One Day International cricket umpires
Pakistani Twenty20 International cricket umpires
People from Lahore